Jeffrey L. Harmening is president and chief executive officer (CEO) of General Mills, having taken over from Ken Powell in June 2017.  He was chief operating officer (COO) of General Mills from July 2016 to May 2017.

He earned a bachelor's degree from DePauw University (1989), and an MBA from Harvard Business School (1994).

References

Living people
American chief executives of Fortune 500 companies
American chief operating officers
American manufacturing businesspeople
American chief executives of food industry companies
Chairmen of General Mills
DePauw University alumni
Harvard Business School alumni
Year of birth missing (living people)